The coat of arms of Cyprus may refer to the national symbol used in either the Republic of Cyprus or Northern Cyprus.

Republic of Cyprus

The coat of arms of the Republic of Cyprus depicts a dove carrying an olive branch, symbolizing peace, over "1960", the year of Cypriot independence from British rule. The background is a copper-yellow colour; this symbolises the large deposits of copper ore on Cyprus (chiefly in the form of chalcopyrite, which is yellow in colour). The two-part wreath represents the two ethnic groups of Cyprus, Greeks and Turks.

The Cypriot coat of arms was selected as the main motif of a high value collectors' coin in 2008, the Cyprus introduction to the Eurozone commemorative coin, minted in 2008. The obverse depicts the coat of arms of Cyprus while the reverse depicts Cyprus connected with a ring to Europe, on a transfigured map.

Northern Cyprus

The coat of arms of the internationally unrecognized Turkish Republic of Northern Cyprus are styled closely on the arms of the Republic of Cyprus, except that the ‘1960’ was removed from the shield underneath the dove, replaced with the year '1983' atop the shield, in reference to the Declaration of Independence of the Turkish Republic of Northern Cyprus by Turkey after the Turkish invasion of Cyprus, as well as the Turkish star and crescent emblem was being added above the shield.

In March 2007, a slight change to the layout of the arms was made. The dove is in a different attitude.

Previous coats of arms

When Cyprus was a British Crown Colony, local colonial officials used a coat of arms (which were never in fact officially granted) of two lions passant guardant, based on the coat of arms of the United Kingdom.

References

External links
 Cyprus — from International Civic Heraldry

Cyprus
National symbols of Cyprus
Cyprus
Cyprus
Cyprus